The Shilling Avenue Historic District is a  historic district in Blackfoot, Idaho.  It was listed on the National Register of Historic Places in 1983.  It included 26 contributing buildings.

Location: Shilling Ave. between E. Idaho and Bingham Sts. and Bridge and Judicial Sts. to Stout Ave.
Blackfoot, ID
Architect: Multiple
Architecture: Mixed (more Than 2 Styles From Different Periods)
Other names: 0710791653
Historic function: Education; Domestic; Religion
Historic subfunction: Religious Structure; Single Dwelling; Multiple Dwelling; School
Criteria: event, event, architecture/engineering, architecture/engineering, person, person

It includes:
Fred T. Dubois House (1891), 320 East Main, a two-story frame residence.  It was built as home of Fred T. Dubois shortly after he was elected to his first term in the U.S. Senate.

The NRHP document mentions Dubois Historic District as if it was the draft name of the district.

Also, "The Shilling Avenue Historic District incorporates a previously listed historic district, the North Shilling Historic District."

References

Historic districts on the National Register of Historic Places in Idaho
National Register of Historic Places in Bingham County, Idaho